Striking Out is an Irish television legal drama series, broadcast on RTÉ, that first aired on 1 January 2017. Produced by Bl!nder F!lms for RTÉ Television, Striking Out stars Amy Huberman as Dublin-based solicitor Tara Rafferty, who is currently working for a fledgling legal firm. Filmed in Dublin and Wicklow, the first series, comprising four episodes, was broadcast during January 2017, to critical acclaim. Subsequently, the series was sold to the United States, where it made its North American debut on Acorn TV on 17 March 2017. Internationally, the series has been distributed by DCD Rights and Acorn Media Enterprises.

The series drew the highest Sunday night ratings for RTÉ in over a year. Prior to the broadcast of the first episode, RTÉ's Head of Drama Jane Gogan confirmed to the Irish Examiner that a second series was already in development. Subsequently, a second series was officially confirmed by RTÉ, with filming taking place throughout the summer of 2017. The second series, extended to six episodes, commenced broadcasting in 2018, with Maria Doyle Kennedy, Moe Dunford and Jane Brennan amongst the new cast members. Simon Massey will also act as the director. In 2018, Channel 5 Broadcasting Ltd acquired the rights to air the series in the United Kingdom, with the first series airing on the newly launched 5Select from 13 February 2018.

There are currently no plans to develop a third season of the drama, despite the 'cliff hanger' ending of season 2.

Synopsis
Striking Out follows the professional and personal life of Dublin-based solicitor, Tara Rafferty.

Cast

Main cast
 Amy Huberman as Tara Rafferty; a Dublin-based solicitor 
 Neil Morrissey as Vincent Pike; SC and close friend of Tara's
 Rory Keenan as Eric Dunbar; Tara's cheating ex-fiancé and former colleague
 Fiona O'Shaughnessy as Meg Reilly; a private investigator and tech guru
 Emmet Byrne as Ray Lamont; a petty criminal represented by Tara whom she later employs
 Maria Doyle Kennedy as George Cusack; Tara's new office partner (Series 2—)
 Moe Dunford as Sam Dunbar; Eric's younger brother (Series 2—)
 Paul Antony-Barber as Richard Dunbar; senior partner in the law firm and Eric's father
 Nick Dunning as Conrad Rafferty; Tara's father, who works as a barrister
 Ingrid Craigie as Irene Rafferty; Tara's mother and former legal secretary
 Brahm Gallagher as Pete; a local cafe owner who allows Tara to set up her fledgling firm in his back office (Series 1 — Series 2, Episode 1)

Recurring cast
 Conall Keating as Steve; Ray's partner
 Kate Gilmore as Lucy Whelan; receptionist at Dunbar's 
 Sam McGovern as "Bookworm" Joe; a junior counsel
 Natalie Radmall-Quirke as Caroline Walsh; an employee at Dunbar's
 Elva Trill as Gillian; an employee at Dunbar's
 Susannah De Wrixon as Joan Dunbar; Eric's mother
 Enda Oates as Phillip McGrath (Series 2—)
 Michael James Ford as Nigel Fitzjames (Series 2—)
 Jane Brennan as Deidre York (Series 2—)

Episodes

Series 1 (2017)

Series 2 (2018)

References

External links

2017 Irish television series debuts
Irish drama television series
RTÉ original programming
Irish legal television series
English-language television shows